The Smart Roadster (W452) is a two-door, two-seater sports car (S-segment in Europe) first introduced in 2002 by Smart GmbH. Sales of the Roadster and Roadster Coupé were mostly successful, and the production ended in November 2005 after 4,300 Roadsters were made. The last one built now resides in the Mercedes-Benz Museum.

History 

The two-seat, 2.5 m (98 in)-long Smart City-Coupe (later named Smart Fortwo) was launched at the 1998 Paris Motor Show. This was the beginning of a new car brand and one of the more radical vehicle concepts to hit the European market since the bubble cars of the 1950s. It was also the beginning of a difficult period for Smart. The City Coupe had stability problems that were only discovered prior to the launch. This forced a package of alterations to be made that were both expensive and compromised the car's handling, ride, and gear shift. Public concerns over the car's stability, combined with Smart's elitist marketing and the sheer radicality of the car's design, proved damaging to initial sales. Production projections were slashed from 200,000 per year to 80,000 which was almost disastrous for a new brand with just one product.

Within the company, the evangelical buzz surrounding the launch of the radical City-Coupe quickly evaporated. With new management, new marketing initiatives, and continuing revisions to the car's engineering to answer public concerns, future vehicle plans, including the development of a four-seat model, had not been far advanced.

Design and development 

Under design director Jens Manske in autumn 1998, Smart's 14-person design and engineering team began to sketch possible future Smart cars. They soon realised that the powertrain of the City-Coupe was ideal for a small sports car, with a compact turbo engine driving the rear wheels via a 6-speed automated manual gearbox.

Following Smart's ‘reduce to the max’ philosophy and general innovative approach, a concept for a super compact, practical, and pure sports car was generated.
Two quarter-scale exterior and two quarter-scale interior models were made in February 1999 with Volker Leutz's exterior and Christoph Machinek's interior proposals selected for development into full-size development models.
The design of the car had progressed considerably by the time Michael Mauer officially arrived from Mercedes-Benz's Japan design centre to take over Menske's position in May 1999. Mauer worked closely with the design team to quickly develop the roadster, with the intention now of producing a show car for the upcoming 1999 IAA motor show in Frankfurt.	

By June the full-size models of the roadster were handed over to Stola in Italy for production of the show car model, which was produced in about three months for the car's debut at the Frankfurt show.
The Roadster concept was well received at Frankfurt and helped to convince management that the car should be developed for production. At the same time, a decision was made to develop Mauer's idea for a coupe version as a concept car for the Paris motor show a year later.
As the development of the coupe concept began, so the roadster show car was developed over the following year with both exterior and interior designs completed by November 2000. However, colour and trim design continued until a year later. 	

By early 2000, the Smart City-Coupe had finally started to gain sales momentum, with its Cabrio version making a significant addition to total Smart sales. In March Mauer left Smart for Saab, succeeded by Hartmut Sinkwitz in May. As the third design director of Smart during the Roadster's development, Sinkwitz had to bring the concept to production in a very short time. This task may have been made somewhat easier by the Roadster having been designed from the start to use existing powertrain and other City-Coupe components. Given some of the advanced design features, it is a credit to the design team that so much of the concept car made it to production.

Concept car 
The ‘Roadster Coupe’ as shown at the 2000 Paris Motor Show was already on its way to production form. It shared the design of the Roadster from the doors forward but had a glass Targa roof and rear structure resembling a small shooting-brake in the same way as the BMW Z3 coupe and the Saab 9X concept car developed under Mauer at Saab a few years later.

Production versions of both Roadster and Roadster Coupe debuted together at the 2002 Paris Motor Show and were available to buy within a few months. Both cars were unique in the market, being significantly smaller than the Toyota MR2, MG TF, Fiat Barchetta and Mazda MX-5, but offering similar performance and practicality to the base versions of these cars while being significantly more fuel-efficient, albeit at a similar price point.

Production 

The Smart Roadster and Roadster Coupé were introduced in 2002, based on a stretched platform of the Fortwo with a full-length of 3427 mm. The two variants are meant to be reminiscent of the British roadster of yore, such as the Triumph Spitfire or the MG B. Both the Roadster and Roadster Coupé are available with a removable Targa roof or an electrical softtop. The Roadster is powered by 45 or 60 kW (61 or 82 PS) versions of the turbocharged 698cc 3-cylinder Suprex engine in the rear, which is engineered by Mercedes-Benz. The Roadster Coupé has only the more powerful  engine. A steering wheel with Formula 1-style paddle-shifters, to control the single-clutch automated manual transmission, is optional.

The Brabus versions have a different twin sports exhaust, lower suspension, polished six-spoke aluminum alloy Monoblock VI 17" wheels (205/40 ZR17 at the front and 225/35 ZR17 at the rear), front spoiler, side skirts and radiator grille. Exclusive Brabus (Xclusive) interior includes a leather-trimmed dashboard, alloy-effect accent parts, instrument graphics, leather/aluminium gearshift with Brabus labelled starter button, aluminium handbrake handle (which fouls the central armrest), aluminium pedals and Brabus labeled floor mats. The Monoblock wheels are known to be very soft and as a result, are very easy to buckle. The lacquer on these wheels is also very poor, and corrosion can occur very early in the life of the wheel.

Despite a projected break-even of only 8,000 to 10,000 units per year, first-year sales almost doubled this estimate.  British motoring television show and magazine Top Gear praised the Roadster, awarding it Fun Car Of The Year for 2005.

43,091 Roadsters were built and put on the shop fronts, with chassis numbers ranging from 00,001 to around 43,400.

Brabus V6 Bi-Turbo prototypes 

In 2003, German tuning house Brabus created a prototype version of the Roadster Coupé with two merged 3-cylinder engines to celebrate the 100th anniversary of the Solituderennen.

Since the twin-turbo V6 engine occupies almost twice as much space as their 3-cylinder engines, the fuel tank had to be relocated to the nose of the car, where a luggage compartment used to be. It comes in the form of a Formula 1-type foam-rubber fuel bladder. The bigger engine also forced a change from separate coil springs and dampers to concentric units to support the de Dion rear suspension.

Ten cars were built and presented at the Castle Solitude. They are not available for sale and are not even allowed to be driven on public roads in Germany. Some of Mercedes' race drivers, like Markus Winkelhock, drove guests around the event's race track.

Special editions 

In March 2006 Smart unveiled the final variant of the Roadster at the Geneva Motor Show: a limited collector's edition.

The interior had brown leather and higher quality materials were used extensively.
It had the new Runline aluminium wheels and Brabus exhaust, front spoiler, and side fenders.
Of 50 planned cars only 30 were made.

A limited-edition Roadster Coupe Racing edition (RCR) was released in 2005 in the UK. Only 50 in the world were made and featured all the Brabus trimmings plus special black Alcantara and leather seats with red diamond pattern stitching. The seats were not heated as they are in the main Brabus model. The black Alcantara and red stitching also featured on the dash and door panels. Interior door handles and clock surrounds were finished in red to match the exterior paintwork. Each comes with a numbered plaque on the glovebox - stating the build number - RCR UK #/50. These cars were finished in Ferrari Red with matching light surrounds and bumper sections, the Tridion safety cell being all silver. The reason they were not fitted with the  engine is that the cars came off the production line in 2004 as normal  engined roadsters before being given the Brabus makeover. The SB2 upgrade was optional to allow customers the option for lower insurance and road tax/ emissions. So some RCRs did not have the SB2 upgrade carried out when new. Additionally, BRABUS built 7 left-handed cars (RCR 90) for the rest of Europe and only 12 cars of the RCR 101 were altogether built left-handed by BRABUS with the real BRABUS 101 HP engine. One prototype and 11 numbered cars.

Bluewave:  It seems customers could not wait for the Brabus model to come along, so Smart released this version in the UK. Effectively, it has all the parts of the later released Brabus model but without the Brabus engine and without the Brabus suspension. Smart later upset those who purchased the Bluewave by releasing the Brabus for the same price with those extra items. Some Bluewave owners were given the choice of having their car purchased back or a free SB2 upgrade.

An additional, UK and Sweden-only 'Finale Edition' was unveiled in April 2006. This model came in a variety of colour combinations, including an exclusive speed silver and black Tridion with 17-inch Runline alloys and 'flow silver' interior components. It also featured leather door and cockpit trim and central armrest.

Project Kimber 

In 2006, David James initiated Project Kimber, an attempt to restart production of the Smart Roadster in the United Kingdom. Initially, intended to be rebadged as an MG model, after an unsuccessful bid for the MG marque, the revised Roadster was later referred to as the AC Ace. However, as of 2013, the project appears to be dormant.

Knight and Day 
In the 2010 movie Knight and Day, the Smart Roadster appears in the final chase scene. These vehicles were retrofitted with an engine from a Suzuki GSX-R motorcycle to improve power and throttle response, which was accomplished with a kit made by a British company. Three of the cars were bike-powered, and three more had conventionally tuned 698cc 3 cylinder engines featuring ECU remap, cold air intake/filter, performance exhaust, stiffer engine mounts, improved brakes, and lowered suspension by a Smart specialist in Hampshire, England.

Gallery

References

External links 

 smart (official UK community site)
 Smart (official site)
 TheRoadster.net (smart Roadster owners enthusiast website)

Roadster
Rear mid-engine, rear-wheel-drive vehicles 
Cars introduced in 2003
Microcars
Roadsters
Brabus vehicles